Rock Lake was a provincial electoral division in the Canadian province of Manitoba.

The constituency was created by redistribution in 1956, and existed from the 1958 provincial election until the 1981 election. Most of the area was merged into the constituency of Pembina.

It was located in the southern part of the province. It was bordered to the north by Souris-Lansdowne, to the east by Pembina, to the west by Turtle Mountain, and to the south by the American state of North Dakota.

List of provincial representatives

Electoral results
Source: Elections Manitoba

1958:
(x)Abram Harrison(PC) 2,465
Walter E. Clark (LP) 2,227
1959:
(x)Abram Harrison (PC) 2,545
Walter E. Clark (LP) 1,843
Cyril Hamwee (CCF) 632
1962:
Abram Harrison (PC) 2,444
Harry Parsonage (L) 2,015
J.A. Potter (NDP) 257
1966:
Henry Einarson (PC) 1,835
Ronald Gardiner (L) 1,691
Jacob Harms (SC) 505
Ernest Sloane (NDP) 333
1969:
(x)Henry Einarson (PC) 3,064
Remi Engelbert DePape (L) 1,818
Timothy Leonard (NDP) 763
1973:
(x)Henry Einarson (PC) 3,470
Paul Cenerini (NDP) 1,825
Arnold Collins (L) 1,361
1977:
(x)Henry Einarson (PC) 4,243
Ronald Devos (L) 1,167
Eric Irwin (NDP) 1,029

References

Former provincial electoral districts of Manitoba